Colin Mackenzie Simpson (born March 5, 1959) is a lawyer and Republican politician who served in the Wyoming House of Representatives from District 24 from 1999 to 2011. He was the House Speaker during his last two years in office. He finished fourth in the Republican primary for the 2010 gubernatorial election. After leaving the legislature in early 2011, Simpson resumed his law practice in Cody.

Family and personal life
Simpson was born in Cheyenne and is a fifth generation Wyomingite. His father is former U.S. Senator Alan Simpson; his grandfather was former U.S. Senator and Governor Milward Simpson. An uncle, Pete Simpson, served in the Wyoming House and is a retired administrator at the University of Wyoming in Laramie.

Simpson is married to the former Deborah Oakley, who was reared in Kemmerer, Wyoming. The couple has two sons, Mackenzie and Nicholas. Simpson currently practices law in Cody and is a member of the Board of Trustees of the Buffalo Bill Historical Center there.

Education
Simpson received his undergraduate degree from Colorado College and his Juris Doctor from the University of Wyoming.

Political career

Simpson was elected to the Wyoming Legislature in 1998 and served six terms as a Republican representative from Park County. Simpson served as the Speaker of the House for two years and before that served as the House's Majority Leader and Speaker Pro Tem. During his time in office, he also served as Chairman of the House Judiciary Committee, Vice Chairman of the Appropriations Committee and Co-Chairman of the Select Committee on Mental Health and Substance Abuse. Simpson left the legislature in January 2011 after losing the gubernatorial nomination.

He announced in 2008 that he would challenge U.S. Congresswoman Barbara Cubin in the primary for her seat. Cubin decided, however, to retire, and Simpson did not enter the race after all. The seat went instead to fellow Republican Cynthia Lummis. Simpson unsuccessfully sought to replace Craig Thomas in the U.S. Senate after Thomas' death in June 2007. He was among the top ten finalists before the Republican selection committee. The seat ultimately went to John Barrasso, a physician and State Senator from Casper.

2010 gubernatorial candidacy

Simpson stated in an interview in the spring of 2008 that he was interested in running for governor, should Democratic Governor Dave Freudenthal be term-limited. Simpson filed to form an exploratory committee to run for governor. On March 18, 2010, he announced his candidacy for the Republican gubernatorial nomination and was immediately seen as the frontrunner for the nomination. His opponents included former state representative and former Director of Agriculture Ron Micheli, former U.S. Attorney Matt Mead, and State Auditor Rita Meyer. Mead narrowly won the nomination, with Meyer and Micheli in second and third places, respectively. Simpson then conceded and endorsed Mead's candidacy.

References

External links
Representative Colin Mak official Wyoming State Legislature site
Colin Simpson for Governor official campaign site

1959 births
Living people
American people of Dutch descent
Speakers of the Wyoming House of Representatives
Politicians from Cheyenne, Wyoming
American people of English descent
People from Cody, Wyoming
Wyoming lawyers
American people of Scottish descent
Republican Party members of the Wyoming House of Representatives
American Episcopalians